Get Down Live! is the first live album by KC and the Sunshine Band, released in 1995.

It is a compilation of several shows that were recorded at/in Fountain Blue, Miami Beach, New Year's Eve '93/'94, Houston, Texas '94, Australia '94, Peru, South America '94, New York '94, Madison Square Garden, Atlanta, GA, '94.

The CD was rereleased in 2003 as "Greatest Hits Live" on the "Varese Fontana" Label with ASIN B00009VTYU with a 100% identical Track listing, but a different packing.

Track listing
"Opening ("KC, KC, KC")" (A. Lopez, B. Martinez) – 0:20
"Give It Up" (H. W. Casey, D. Carter) – 3:53
"Shake Your Booty" (Casey, R. Finch) – 3:08
"James Brown Medley: Sex Machine/I Feel Good" (James Brown, Bobby Byrd, Ron Lenhoff) – 3:16
"Boogie Man Medley: I'm Your Boogie Man/Keep It Comin' Love/It's The Same Old Song" (Casey, Finch, Eddie Holland, Lamont Dozier, Brian Holland) – 4:57
"I Want to Take You Higher" (Sylvester Stewart) – 6:02
"Amazing Grace" (traditional) – 3:34
"Party" (Casey) – 3:59
"I Betcha Didn't Know That" (S. Dees, F. Knight) – 4:24
"Latin Funk" (Lopez, Martinez) – 1:57
"New Attitude" (B. Hull, S. Robinson, J. Gilutin) – 2:44
"Boogie Shoes" (Casey, Finch) – 3:28
"Please Don't Go" (Casey, Finch) – 10:35
"That's The Way (I Like It)" (Casey, Finch) – 5:38
"Get Down Tonight" (Casey, Finch) – 4:45
"Yes, I'm Ready" (B. Mason) – 3:07
"KC In The House" (Casey) – 7:45

Personnel
Harry Wayne Casey – vocals
Amaury López – keyboards
Ernest "Snuffy" Stewart – keyboards
Manny López – guitar
Rusty Taylor – bass
Orlando Hernandez – drums
Fofi Lancha – drums
Efrin – drums
Johnny Byrne – drums
Fermin Goytisolo – percussion
Eguie Castrillo – percussion
Bobby Martinez – saxophone
Tony Conception – trumpet
Dana Teboe – trombone
Beverly Champion Foster – background vocals
Maria DeCrescenzo – background vocals
Hialeah High School Chorus – choir

References

KC and the Sunshine Band albums
1995 live albums